Clifford the Big Red Dog is a 2021 live-action animated fantasy comedy film directed by Walt Becker from a screenplay by Blaise Hemingway and the writing team of Jay Scherick and David Ronn, and a story by Justin Malen and Ellen Rapoport, based on the children's book series of the same name by Norman Bridwell. The film stars Jack Whitehall, Darby Camp, Tony Hale, Sienna Guillory, David Alan Grier, Russell Wong, Izaac Wang, Kenan Thompson and John Cleese.

The film was screened unannounced on August 26, 2021, during the 2021 CinemaCon event in Los Angeles. It was initially scheduled to premiere at the 2021 Toronto International Film Festival in September 2021, to be followed by a theatrical release in the United States on September 17 after being delayed due to the COVID-19 pandemic by Paramount Pictures, but was ultimately pulled from the festival and had its release date removed from Paramount's schedule due to the spread of the SARS-CoV-2 Delta variant. Ultimately, the film was simultaneously released theatrically and digitally on Paramount+ on November 10, 2021, in the United States. It received mixed reviews from critics and grossed $107 million worldwide on a $64 million budget. A sequel is in development.

Plot
In New York City, Emily Elizabeth Howard, a 12-year-old middle school student who lives with her mother, Maggie, is regularly bullied by a popular girl at school named Florence, but finds comfort in her only new friend Owen Yu. Maggie leaves her in the care of her van-dwelling and irresponsible uncle Casey before going to Chicago for a business trip.

Mr. Bridwell, who runs an animal rescue tent at a park, introduces Emily to a small red puppy whose family had been taken by dogcatchers. He tells her that the puppy will grow based on how much love he receives. Casey rejects the adoption due to dogs not being allowed in the apartment building. When Emily gets home from school, she finds the puppy in her backpack and names him Clifford. Casey allows her to keep Clifford only for one night.

The next morning, Clifford has grown to giant proportions. Emily and Casey attempt to hide him from the building's superintendent, Mr. Packard. They try taking Clifford to a veterinarian, but he chases and plays with a man in an inflatable bubble. Word of his existence quickly spreads online. After learning from the vet's secretary of Bridwell's past miracles with animals and their owners, the Howards plan to get information on his whereabouts. As Emily is getting lunch for Clifford from the cafeteria, Clifford escapes from Casey's truck and humiliates Florence, giving Emily the friends she always wanted.

Zac Tieran, the owner of biotechnology company Lyfegro, discovers Clifford on social media. He lies to the police that Clifford is his dog and has them search for him. After being evicted from their apartment and chased by the police and Lyfegro guards, Emily and Casey take shelter in Owen's lavish apartment. Casey tells Emily she can keep Clifford if they find Bridwell and take his advice. If he cannot help, Clifford must be sent to China, where Owen's father has a sanctuary. They race to the hospital, only to find Bridwell's empty bed and a patient who tells them Bridwell has died. Clifford is thus sent away by a boat arranged by Mr. Yu as Emily tearfully says goodbye.

The next day, Clifford is captured on the ship by Lyfegro personnel and sent to Lyfegro. Emily soon learns Bridwell did not die, so she and Casey try to save Clifford from being operated on at Lyfegro, aided by friends from their neighborhood. They break into Lyfegro's headquarters and rescue Clifford, who then flees through the city with Emily riding on him.

At Manhattan Bridge Park, a large crowd gathers as Emily desperately asks Bridwell to help, and he tells her that she must stand up for herself and for Clifford and that being different is a gift. Emily explains to everyone the importance of love, regardless of differences. However, Tieran, who arrived right after Emily finished her monologue, orders the police chief to see who Clifford's owner is by checking an ID chip he had implanted. When the chip identifies Emily as Clifford's rightful owner, the police arrest Tieran and inform him that he will be fined for lying to them. Emily, Casey, and Maggie are welcomed back into their apartment. Casey gets a job at Scholastic Corporation and moves out of his van.

Cast
 Frank Welker as the vocal effects of Clifford, a 10-foot tall red dog who was saved from Mr. Bridwell.
 Darby Camp as Emily Elizabeth Howard, a 12-year-old girl who has to save Clifford from Lyfegro.
 Jack Whitehall as Casey Porter, Emily's clumsy yet good-natured uncle and Maggie's younger brother.
 Tony Hale as Zac Tieran, the owner of Lyfegro, a genetics company that wants Clifford.
 Sienna Guillory as Maggie Howard, Emily's mother and Casey's older sister who is on a business trip in Chicago.
 David Alan Grier as Mr. Packard, the building superintendent of the apartment building that Emily and Maggie live in.
 Russell Wong as Mr. Yu, Owen's father.
 John Cleese as Mr. Bridwell, the magical animal rescuer who gives Clifford to Emily. He is named after the creator of the Clifford character, Norman Bridwell.
 Izaac Wang as Owen Yu, the boy from another apartment and Emily's best friend and classmate. He is also the owner of Clifford's pug friend, Brutus (aka "T-Bone")
 Kenan Thompson as Clifford's veterinarian. Thompson voiced the character Hamburger in the original animated series. His nametag reads "Russ T.," a reference to Thompson's character from D2: The Mighty Ducks, Russ Tyler. 
 Tovah Feldshuh as Mrs. Crullerman, Emily's elderly Russian neighbor.
 Paul Rodriguez as Alonzo, the bodega owner and Raul's boss.
 Russell Peters as Malik
 Keith Ewell as Mr. Jarvis, a man whom Clifford saves from falling.
 Mia Ronn as Florence, a popular girl in Emily's school who bullies her.
 Horatio Sanz as Raul, a bodega employee who severed his arm while working and now wears a prosthetic.
 Rosie Perez as Lucille, the hospital receptionist.
 Alex Moffat as Albert, Tieran's loyal employee.
 Jessica Keenan Wynn as Colette, Tieran's scheming lawyer.
 Siobhan Fallon Hogan as Petra
 Ty Jones as Watkins, the chief of police
 Bear Allen-Blaine as Mrs. Jarvis, Emily's faithful lawyer who helps her save Clifford from Lyfegro.

Production
In May 2012, it was reported that Universal Pictures and Illumination Entertainment would produce a live-action/animated film based on the book. Matt Lopez was hired to write the script while Chris Meledandri and Deborah Forte were to produce, but in July 2013, it was reported that Illumination cancelled the project. On September 13, 2013, it was reported that the film was still in development at Universal Pictures with David Bowers in talks to direct the film. Like the 2011 film Hop, the titular dog character will be animated while the other characters will be live-action. In 2016, Paramount Pictures had purchased the rights to develop a live-action and animated hybrid film. On September 25, 2017, it was reported that Walt Becker had been hired to direct from a script being re-written by Ellen Rapoport, and from the original written by Justin Malen, which would be produced by Forte through her Silvertongue Films banner. On June 20, 2019, Paramount closed a deal with Entertainment One to co-finance the film. Under the deal, Entertainment One Films would distribute the film in Canada and the United Kingdom excluding TV broadcast rights for the latter country, while Paramount would distribute in all other territories including the United States. On December 25, 2019, a photo from the film was leaked, revealing the computer-generated form of Clifford in the live-action scenery. In May 2019, Camp and Whitehall signed on to star in the film. In June 2019, Cleese, Guillory, Wang, Grier, Rosie Perez, Keith Ewell, Bear Allen-Blaine and Lynn Cohen joined the cast. Principal photography began on June 10, 2019, in New York City and wrapped on August 23, 2019, after 55 days of shooting. The visual effects were made by Moving Picture Company. On November 18, 2020, it was announced that John Debney would compose the film's score. The song "Room for You" performed by Madison Beer, was released on November 5, 2021.

Release
Clifford the Big Red Dog was simultaneously released in theaters in Dolby Cinema and streaming on Paramount+ on November 10, 2021, in the United States. It was initially scheduled to have its world premiere at the 2021 Toronto International Film Festival in September, followed by a theatrical release on September 17 by Paramount Pictures, but the festival premiere was cancelled and the studio removed the film from its release schedule due to the rise of the Delta variant of COVID-19. It was originally scheduled to be released November 13, 2020, before being delayed to November 5, 2021 due to the COVID-19 pandemic. Prior to that, Universal Pictures initially slated the then-unproduced film for April 8, 2016 and then pushed back to December 31, 2016. The film had a surprise unannounced screening on August 26, 2021, during the 2021 CinemaCon event in Los Angeles. The film was then released in the UK on December 10, 2021, by Entertainment One. The film was also dedicated to Richard Robinson, the former CEO of Scholastic Corporation, who passed away on June 5, 2021.

Home media
Clifford the Big Red Dog was released on digital download by Paramount Home Entertainment on December 14, 2021, which features deleted scenes and special features including a behind-the-scenes look with interviews from the cast, and how Clifford's adventures began from the book series to the big screen. It was also released on February 1, 2022, on Blu-ray and DVD.

Reception

Box office
Clifford the Big Red Dog grossed $49 millionin the United States and Canada and $58.4million in other territories, for a worldwide total of $107.4million against a $64 million budget. In the United States and Canada, Clifford the Big Red Dog was projected to gross $15–17 million from 3,695 theaters over its first five days. The film made $2.3 million on its first day and $3.3 million on its second. It went on to debut to $16.4 million (and a total of $22 million over the five days), finishing second behind holdover Eternals. In its second weekend the film fell 51% to $8.1 million, finishing third. The film made $725,000 on Thanksgiving and then $5 million in its third weekend, placing sixth. The film went on to make $1.9 million in its fourth weekend, $1.3 million in its fifth, and $404,068 in its sixth.

Critical response
The website's critics consensus reads: "It may get younger viewers to sit and stay, but Clifford the Big Red Dog is nowhere near as charming as its classic source material." On Metacritic the film has a weighted average score of 55 out of 100, based on 21 critics, indicating "mixed or average reviews". Audiences polled by CinemaScore gave the film an average grade of "A" on an A+ to F scale, while those at PostTrak gave it 4.5 out of 5 stars.

Owen Gleiberman of Variety wrote: "Clifford the Big Red Dog becomes a rowdy chase film-- as agreeable as Clifford himself, as simultaneously cute and in-your-face and as genially random in its ability to create chaos." Angie Han of The Hollywood Reporter wrote: "It's not reinventing the wheel or breaking new ground; [and] it's unlikely to wow audiences with its bold artistic vision or profound emotional depths. But there's a place for sturdy and familiar entertainment that delivers exactly what it intends, and Clifford the Big Red Dog is just that."

Graphic novel adaptation
Comic writer Georgia Ball and illustrator Chi Ngo adapted the film into a graphic novel entitled Clifford the Big Red Dog: The Movie Graphic Novel, which was originally scheduled to be published on August 23, 2021, but was pushed back to December 7, 2021, one month after the film's release.

Sequel
In November 2021, it was reported that Paramount Pictures and Entertainment One are developing a sequel to the film.

References

External links

 
 
 

2021 films
2021 comedy films
2021 fantasy films
2020s American films
2020s Canadian films
2020s children's comedy films
2020s children's fantasy films
2020s English-language films
American children's comedy films
American children's fantasy films
Canadian children's comedy films
Canadian children's fantasy films
English-language Canadian films
Clifford the Big Red Dog
Entertainment One films
Films about animal cruelty
Films about dogs
Films about friendship
Films about giants
Films about pets
Films about size change
Films adapted into comics
Films based on children's books
Films directed by Walt Becker
Films postponed due to the COVID-19 pandemic
Films scored by John Debney
Films set in Chicago
Films set in New York City
Films shot in Chicago
Films shot in New York City
Films with live action and animation
Middle school films
Paramount Pictures animated films
Paramount Pictures films
Paramount+ original films